The Italy men's national under-18 and under-19 basketball team is the national representative for Italy in international under-18 and under-19 basketball tournaments. They are administered by the Federazione Italiana Pallacanestro.

The team regularly competes at the FIBA U18 European Championship, and also won three medals at the FIBA Under-19 World Cup.

Competitive record

FIBA U18 European Championship

FIBA Under-19 World Cup

See also
Italy men's national basketball team
Italy men's national under-20 basketball team
Italy men's national under-17 basketball team
Italy women's national under-19 basketball team

References

External links
 Official website 
 Archived records of Italy team participations

U
Basketball
Men's national under-18 basketball teams
Men's national under-19 basketball teams